Elja Arjas (born February 9, 1943 in Tampere) is a Finnish mathematician and statistician. He is professor emeritus at the University of Helsinki.

Education and career 
Arjas studied mathematics at the University of Helsinki and graduated with a bachelor's degree in philosophy in 1964. He graduated with a licentiate in mathematics and statistics in 1970 and received his doctorate in mathematics in 1972, under the supervision of Olli Lokki and Gustav Elfving. He was a research fellow at the Center for Operations Research and Econometrics at the Université catholique de Louvain until 1973, before moving back to Finland.

Arjas was a professor of applied mathematics and statistics at the University of Oulu between 1975 and 1997. Between 1992 and 1997, he worked as an academy professor at the Academy of Finland, and from 1997 to 2009 as a part-time professor of biometrics at the University of Helsinki and as a research professor at the Institute of Health and Welfare. Arjas was a visiting professor at the University of British Columbia between 1978 and 1979, a visiting professor at the University of Washington and the Fred Hutchinson Cancer Research Center from 1984 to 1985.

Hononrs and awards 
Arjas was elected a fellow of the International Statistical Institute in 1977, a fellow of the a member of the Institute of Mathematical Statistics in 1982, and a member of the Finnish Academy of Sciences in 2001. He received a honorary doctorate from the University of Oulu in 2006.

References 

1943 births
Finnish mathematicians
Finnish statisticians
Academic staff of the University of Oulu
University of Helsinki alumni
Academic staff of the University of Helsinki
Fellows of the Institute of Mathematical Statistics
People from Tampere
Mathematical statisticians
Living people